Milan Milošević (born September 26, 1985) is a Bosnian professional basketball player who plays for Shabab Al Ahli Basket. He also represents the senior men's Bosnia and Herzegovina national basketball team. He is 2.05 m (6 ft. 8  in.) tall, and he can play at both the small forward and power forward positions.

Professional career
Milošević started his pro career with Hercegovac Bileća during the 2003–04 season. In 2005, he moved to Sloboda Tuzla where he played for almost 3 years. In the 2008–09 season, he moved to Serbia and joined Crvena zvezda. He then returned to Bosnia and played for Bosna Sarajevo.

He then moved to Cyprus and played for Keravnos Strovolou in 2010, and later to Budućnost Podgorica in 2011. He joined Zlatorog Laško in 2013.

In 2014, he agreed to terms with Panionios, but he left the club before playing in a single game. Later that season, he signed a one-year contract with AEK. He sometimes came off the bench, while Dušan Šakota served as the team's starting power forward. He had a solid season with AEK, and in August 2015, the team re-signed him for the 2015–16 season. In June 2016, he re-signed with AEK for the 2016–17 season.

On September 22, 2017, after three years with AEK Athens, Milošević joined Promitheas Patras of the Greek Basket League. On July 19, 2018, he agreed to join Lavrio and stay in Greece for another season. He averaged 11.6 points and 5.3 rebounds per game for Lavrio. On August 16, 2019, Milošević signed with Aris. On September 22, 2020, he re-signed with Aris for the 2020-21 season.

On March 31, 2022, he has signed with Büyükçekmece Basketbol of the Turkish Basketbol Süper Ligi (BSL).

National team career
Milošević has also been a member of the senior men's Bosnia and Herzegovina national basketball team. With Bosnia's senior national team, he played at the EuroBasket 2011. He was also called by Bosnian head coach, Duško Ivanović, to participate at the team's training camp for EuroBasket 2015, and he managed to make the team's final roster and play at the tournament.

Career statistics

|-
| 2014–15
| style="text-align:left;"|AEK
| align=left | GBL
| 26 || 17.0 || .432 || .189 || .714 || 5.3 || 1.3 ||  0.6 || 0.1 || 6.8
|-
| 2015–16
| style="text-align:left;"|AEK
| align=left | GBL
| 26 || 19.5 || .417 || .312 || .750 || 5.5 || 1.0 || 0.6 || 0.2 || 8.7
|-
| 2016–17
| style="text-align:left;"|AEK
| align=left | GBL
| 14 || 22.1 || .402 || .206 || .673 || 5.7 || 1.1 || 0.7 || 0.2 || 8.7
|-
| 2017–18
| style="text-align:left;"|Promitheas
| align=left | GBL
| 20 || 25.3 || .489 || .297 || .619 || 5.7 || 1.4 || 0.5 || 0.2 || 12.6
|}

Playoffs

|-
| 2014–15
| style="text-align:left;"|AEK
| align=left | GBL
| 3 || 21.2 || .315 || .250 || .571 || 8.3 || 2.3 || 1.3 || 0.0 || 6.0
|-
| 2015–16
| style="text-align:left;"| AEK
| align=left | GBL
| 10 || 23.3 || .470 || .345 || .773 || 6.9 || 1.2 || 0.5 || 0.4 || 8.9
|-
| 2016–17
| style="text-align:left;"| AEK
| align=left | GBL
| 9 || 22.0 || .422 || .192 || .450 || 6.6 || 0.9 || 0.2 || 0.0 || 7.6
|-
| 2017–18
| style="text-align:left;"|Promitheas
| align=left | GBL
| 1 ||  23.1 || .571 || .500 || 1.000 || 4.0 || 2.0 || 0 || 0 || 12.0
|}

FIBA Champions League

|-
| style="text-align:left;" | 2016–17
| style="text-align:left;" | A.E.K.
| 13 || 20.3 || .478 || .217 || .758 || 5.6 || .7 || .8 || .4 || 7.2
|}

References

External links
FIBA Profile
FIBA (game-center) Profile
EuroCup Profile
Interperformances.com Profile
Eurobasket.com Profile
Draftexpress.com Profile
ABA League Profile
Greek Basket League 

1985 births
Living people
ABA League players
AEK B.C. players
Aris B.C. players
Bosnia and Herzegovina expatriate basketball people in Serbia
Bosnia and Herzegovina men's basketball players
Büyükçekmece Basketbol players
Keravnos B.C. players
KK Bosna Royal players
KK Budućnost players
KK Crvena zvezda players
KK Zlatorog Laško players
KK Sloboda Tuzla players
Lavrio B.C. players
People from Bileća
Power forwards (basketball)
Promitheas Patras B.C. players
Serbs of Bosnia and Herzegovina
Small forwards
Shabab Al Ahli Basket players